Jorma Tapio Liimatainen (born 31 October 1947 in Suolahti) is a Finnish former wrestler who competed in the 1972 Summer Olympics.

References

External links
 

1947 births
Living people
Olympic wrestlers of Finland
Wrestlers at the 1972 Summer Olympics
Finnish male sport wrestlers